Chris Knight (born June 24, 1960) is an American singer-songwriter from Slaughters, Kentucky. In addition to releasing solo records of his own material, Knight has had a successful career writing songs that have been recorded by Confederate Railroad, John Anderson, and Randy Travis among others.

Biography

Early life
Knight was born in St. Louis, Missouri, and grew up in Slaughters, Kentucky. His extended family lives in the same area of Kentucky. Knight has three brothers and a sister. His father was a pipe liner.

When he was three years old, he asked for a plastic guitar for Christmas. At 15, he became serious and began teaching himself John Prine songs on his older brother's guitar. In an interview, Knight commented "At one point I could play probably 35–40 John Prine songs."

Knight earned a degree in agriculture from Western Kentucky University. He worked for ten years as a mine reclamation inspector and as a miner's consultant for the Kentucky Department of Surface Mining.

Music career
Knight started composing when he was 26, but didn't start performing until he was 30. He got his first record deal when he was 37.

Nashville
In 1986, he heard Steve Earle on the radio and decided to start writing songs. After six years he came to Nashville and won a spot on a songwriters' night at the Bluebird Cafe.

He attracted the interest of music producer Frank Liddell, who signed him to a contract with Bluewater Music. When Decca Records hired Liddell for an A&R position, Knight received a contract and in 1998 Decca released his self-titled debut. Decca folded at the end of the 1990s, only two years after Knight joined the label. After a couple years without a label, Knight signed with Dualtone Music Group.

Knight licensed his music to Dualtone Records for two records, then decided to release his music independently with the help of his manager.

Texas
Knight is well known and because of his particular fame in Texas, was named an "Honorary Texan" in 2006 by Texas Governor Rick Perry.

Early releases
He recorded his first demo tapes, bootlegged—and then self-released—while living alone in a trailer on his property outside Slaughters. Called The Trailer Tapes, they were officially released in 2007. They were one of his best-selling records.

Little Victories
It took Knight four years to release Little Victories in 2012. Knight's former Decca labelmate, Lee Ann Womack, collaborated with him on "You Lie When You Call My Name." Long-time musical hero John Prine sings on the title track. Buddy Miller plays guitar and sings on two tracks: "Missing You" and "Nothing on Me."

Discography

Studio albums

Singles

Music videos

Songs written or co-written by Knight
 "A Pretty Good Guy" – Fred Eaglesmith
 "A Train Not Running" – Stacy Dean Campbell
 "Becky's Bible" – Jason Savory
 "Cry Lonely" – Cross Canadian Ragweed
 "Heart of Stone" – Dan Baird
 "Highway Junkie" – Randy Travis, Gary Allan, The Yayhoos, The Von Ehrics
 "I Don't Want to Hang Out With Me" – Confederate Railroad
 "It Ain't Easy Being Me" – John Anderson, Jason McCoy, and Blake Shelton
 "Love and Gasoline" and "She's Leaving This Town" – The Great Divide
 "Love at 90 Miles an Hour" – Ty Herndon
 "She Couldn't Change Me" – Montgomery Gentry
 "The Hammer Goin Down" – The Road Hammers

Television appearances
In 2015, Chris Knight was featured in Season 1, Episode 2 of CarbonTV's original series, American Elements.

References

External links
Official Website
Chris Knight appearance on American Elements

American country singer-songwriters
Living people
1960 births
People from Webster County, Kentucky
Western Kentucky University alumni
Decca Records artists
Dualtone Records artists
Country musicians from Kentucky
Singer-songwriters from Kentucky
Americana musicians